Jumbo Peak may refer to:

 Jumbo Peak (Washington), Washington State, United States
 Jumbo Peak, in the Tararua Range, New Zealand

See also
 Jumbo Mountain, Washington State, United States
 Jumbo Mountain (Canada), British Columbia